Nirmala High School may refer to:

 Nirmala High School, Brahmavar, Karnataka, India
 Nirmala High School, Vijayawada, Andhra Pradesh, India

See also
 Nirmala Higher Secondary School (disambiguation)